The men's 4×200-metre freestyle relay was a swimming event held as part of the swimming at the 1936 Summer Olympics programme. It was the seventh appearance of the event, which was established in 1908. The competition was held on Monday and Tuesday, 10 and 11 August 1936.

Seventy-four swimmers from 18 nations competed.

Medalists

Note: The International Olympic Committee medal database shows only these swimmers as medalists. Ralph Gilman and Charles Hutter swam for the United States in the semi-finals but were not credited with silver medals.

Records
These were the standing world and Olympic records (in minutes) prior to the 1936 Summer Olympics.

In the final the Japan set a new world record with 8:51.5 minutes.

Results

Semifinals

Monday, 10 August 1936: The fastest two in each semi-final and the next two fastest from across the semi-finals advanced to the final.

Semifinal 1

Semifinal 2

Semifinal 3

Final

Tuesday, 11 August 1936:

References

External links
Olympic Report
 

Swimming at the 1936 Summer Olympics
4 × 200 metre freestyle relay
Men's events at the 1936 Summer Olympics